Placosoma glabellum is a species of lizard in the family Gymnophthalmidae that is endemic to Brazil.

References

Placosoma (lizard)
Reptiles of Brazil
Endemic fauna of Brazil
Reptiles described in 1870
Taxa named by Wilhelm Peters